Hawaii is one of fifty states of the U.S. and covers the Hawaiian Islands, a volcanic archipelago consisting of eight major islands, several atolls and numerous smaller islets. Hawaii became a state of the United States in 1959. Prior to that it was the Territory of Hawaii (1898 to 1959) and originally the Kingdom of Hawaii.

Climate

Geography

Energy

Environmental issues

The majority of the environmental issues affecting Hawaii today are related to pressures from increasing human and animal population in the limited separation space of the islands.

See also

Endemism in the Hawaiian Islands
List of extinct animals of the Hawaiian Islands
 Plug-in electric vehicles in Hawaii

References

External links
Department of Land and Natural Resources at the State of Hawaii
Environment Hawai`i - environmental news about Hawaii